Now Khaleh-ye Akbari (also Romanized as Now Khāleh-ye Akbarī; also known as Naugali, Nau Khāleh, Nokhale, Now Khāleh, Now Khāleh Akbar, Now Khāleh-ye Akbar, and Nukhalekh) is a village in Hend Khaleh Rural District, Tulem District, Sowme'eh Sara County, Gilan Province, Iran. At the 2006 census, its population was 2,393, in 625 families.

References 

Populated places in Sowme'eh Sara County